Yogendra Singh is an Indian politician and a member of the Indian National Congress party from the Indian State of MP.

Personal life
He is married to Preeti Singh.

Political career
He became an MLA from Lakhnadon constituency in 2013, and was re-elected in 2018.

References

See also
Madhya Pradesh Legislative Assembly
2013 Madhya Pradesh Legislative Assembly election
2008 Madhya Pradesh Legislative Assembly election

Madhya Pradesh MLAs 2013–2018
Madhya Pradesh MLAs 2018–2023
1972 births
Living people
Indian National Congress politicians from Madhya Pradesh